Volodymyr Hryhorovych Butkevych (Boutkevich) (born August 2, 1946) is a Ukrainian scholar and human rights lawyer. From 1996 until 2008 he was the Ukrainian judge at the European Court of Human Rights.

In 1994 he was a head of a provisional committee of the Verkhovna Rada to settle Crimean issues.

References

Judges of the European Court of Human Rights
20th-century Ukrainian judges
Ukrainian human rights activists
Living people
Members of the Sub-Commission on the Promotion and Protection of Human Rights
1946 births
People from Vinnytsia Oblast
Second convocation members of the Verkhovna Rada
21st-century Ukrainian judges
Ukrainian officials of the United Nations
Ukrainian judges of international courts and tribunals